Vincenzo Guerini is the name of

 Vincenzo Guerini (athlete) (born 1950), Italian sprinter
 Vincenzo Guerini (footballer) (born 1953), Italian football player and manager